

The FMA IA-59 is a 1970s Argentine single-engined unmanned aerial vehicle, designed and built for the Argentine Air Force by Fabrica Militar de Aviones.

Development 
The small UAV first flew on 9 December 1972 powered by McCulloch piston engine.

Aircraft on display
The only IA-59 built is on display at the Museum of Industry in Córdoba Province, Argentina.

References

IA-59
1970s Argentine military aircraft
Unmanned military aircraft of Argentina